Sunil Lahri (born 9 January 1961), also called Sunil Lahiri, is an Indian actor. He is best known for his portrayal of Lakshmana in the television show Ramayan (1987-1988).

Personal life
Lahri was born in Damoh, Madhya Pradesh on 9 January 1961 to Shikar Chandra Lahiri, a professor in a medical college and Tara Lahri. Lahri has two younger brothers. After completing schooling from Bhopal, Lahri moved to Mumbai, where he graduated with a Bachelor of Arts degree from Mumbai's Wilson College.

In 2012, Lahri donated his father's deceased body to the department of forensics of JK Medical college in Bhopal. According to Lahri, his father understood the issues students face in their studies because of absence of accessibility of human anatomy so he wrote in his will that after his passing his body ought to be given to the medical students in order to help them in their studies. He has a son named Krish. He said during an interview to Dainik Bhaskar that if he gets a chance to play a role in Ramayana again, he will play the role of Ravana.

Career
His debut film was The Naxalites (1980), in which he appeared with Smita Patil. He was also part of the 1985 film Phir Aayi Barsaat with Anuradha Patel .

He has done a major role in the 1991 musical Baharon Ke Manzil. He portrayed 2nd Lieutenant Rama Raghoba Rane in 1990 TV series Param Vir Chakra. In 1995, he made an appearance in the film Janam Kundali. He played the role of Ashwani Mehra, Vinod Khanna's son in the movie. In 2017, he had also appeared in a Hindi film A Daughter's Tale Pankh.

Filmography
Films
 The Naxalites (1980)
 Phir Aayi Barsaat (1985)
 Jazira (1987)
 Baharon Ke Manzil (1991)
 Aaja Meri Jaan (1993)
 Janam Kundli (1995)
 A Daughter’s Tale Pankh(2017)

Television
 Vikram Aur Betaal (1985)
 Ramayan (1987)
 Param Vir Chakra (1988)
 Luv Kush (1988)
 Sapno Ki Duniya (1995-1996)
 The Kapil Sharma Show (2020) - Guest
 Sa Re Ga Ma Pa L'il Champs'' (2020) - Guest

References

External links

1961 births
Living people
Indian male television actors
People from Damoh